Bát Tràng (literally: bát is bowl and tràng is workshop) is an old, well established village in the Gia Lâm district of Hanoi, the capital city of Vietnam. It is about 13 km from central Hanoi.

Bát Tràng is known throughout Vietnam for producing a unique style of ceramics called Bát Tràng Porcelain.

The first museum in Bát Tràng is the private Bát Tràng Museum / Museum of Ceramic Art by Vũ Thắng

References
http://cktcrafts.googlepages.com/battrangvillage
https://vietnamdiscovery.com/hanoi/activities/bat-trang-ceramic-village/
http://battrang.museum/

Culture of Hanoi
Populated places in Hanoi